Supakit Niamkong, formerly Phudit, born 9 January 1988, is a Thai professional footballer who plays as a forward for Thai League 3 club Pattaya Dolphins United.

References
  at Soccerway

1988 births
Living people
Supakit Niamkong
Association football forwards
Supakit Niamkong
Supakit Niamkong
Supakit Niamkong
Supakit Niamkong
Supakit Niamkong